Elizabeth Green, billed professionally as Elizabeth Green the Stork Woman, was an American sideshow performer who was presented to audiences as a human stork during the early 1900s. Her large, long nose and thin bone structure earned her the "Stork-Woman" title.  A genetic condition was responsible for her unusual features, though she had no other known medical problems.

Sideshow career 
Green was the actual "first" performer to be billed as Koo-Koo the Bird Girl and toured with Ringling Brothers Circus. Hers was mainly a comedy act, and it involved her dancing around in a feathered body suit with large bird feet and a long feather on her head. Some claim Green was used at the entrance of the circus, being one of the "less weird-looking" freaks, to catch the attention of passers by. She has also been referred to as Molina the Pinhead; however, this was probably only to differentiate between her and Minnie Woolsey who was also billed as Koo-Koo the Bird Girl. Some claim she appeared in Freaks because she was a movie buff and wanted to obtain an autograph of Ronald Colman.

Film 
She is most prominent for her appearance in Tod Browning's 1932 film Freaks where she is billed as the "stork-woman". She appears in several scenes throughout the movie and has one scene of dialogue alongside Frances O'Connor (the armless girl) while they are seated at a table eating dinner. In the film, Minnie Woolsey received the billing of Koo-Koo the Bird Girl, and is most commonly associated with the billing because she, rather than Elizabeth Green, was featured in the table dance scene. Although what Green thought of her new competition is unknown, she afterwards returned to her role as Koo-Koo the Bird Girl in sideshows.

See also 
 Koo-Koo the Bird Girl

References

External links
Biography at Phreeque.com

American entertainers
Sideshow performers
Year of death missing
Year of birth missing